Festubert Mountain is located on the border of Alberta and British Columbia on the Continental Divide. It was named after Festubert, a village in France.

See also
List of peaks on the Alberta–British Columbia border
Mountains of Alberta
Mountains of British Columbia

References

Two-thousanders of Alberta
Two-thousanders of British Columbia
Canadian Rockies